Maduiyeh (also Romanized as Madū’īyeh) is a village in Tirjerd Rural District, in the Central District of Abarkuh County, Yazd Province, Iran. At the 2006 census, its population was 138, in 39 families.

References 

Populated places in Abarkuh County